Reed Edward Diamond (born July 20, 1967) is an American actor. He is known for the roles of Det. Mike Kellerman on Homicide: Life on the Street, Jason Pillar in season 8 of 24, and recurring character Laurence Dominic on Dollhouse. He also appeared in The Shield, Journeyman, Bones, The Mentalist, Franklin & Bash, and Underground. He had a recurring role on the first two seasons of Designated Survivor as John Foerstel, Director of the FBI, and portrayed Daniel Whitehall / Werner Reinhardt in the Marvel Cinematic Universe (MCU) television series Agents of S.H.I.E.L.D.

Early life and education
Diamond was born in Brooklyn, the son of Allison, an astrologer, and Bob Diamond, a stage manager and director of shows such as The Joe Franklin Show. He was raised in Manhattan and attended the Trinity School.

Diamond attended the University of North Carolina at Chapel Hill for two years, then studied acting at the Juilliard School, where he was a member of the Drama Division's Group 20 (1987–1991).

Career
As a child, Diamond had small parts in the ABC Afterschool Special Sara's Summer of the Swans (1974) and the film Two Minute Warning (1976). His early roles as an adult included guest starring on Law & Order and Class of '96, and such films as Memphis Belle (1990), Clear and Present Danger (1994) and Her Hidden Truth (1995).

His first big break came in 1995 when he joined the cast of Homicide: Life on the Street as Det. Mike Kellerman. Diamond was a regular cast member for Seasons 4–6 before Kellerman was written out at the end of Season 6; but he reprised the role for a two-episode story in the final Season 7. In 2000, a feature-length TV movie was produced to wrap up the series, which saw the return of all the major cast, including Diamond. He made a brief appearance as a police detective in the pilot episode of the 2002 pilot of the controversial series The Shield, as Detective Terry Crowley. He was credited as one of the main cast members and featured prominently in promotional pictures of the show, so as to surprise viewers when he was murdered at the end of the first episode. Roles after that included a re-make of High Noon (2000); Three Days; S.W.A.T. (2003, directed by Diamond's Homicide co-star Clark Johnson); Spider-Man 2 (2004); and Good Night, and Good Luck (2005).

In the 2000s, as well as playing recurring roles in Judging Amy (as Stuart Collins) and Dollhouse (as Lawrence Dominic), Diamond guest-starred on Crossing Jordan, The West Wing, Medium, Numb3rs, CSI: Crime Scene Investigation, Stargate SG-1, Without a Trace, The Mentalist, 24, and Common Law. He portrayed Inspector Jack Vasser in the Fall 2007 NBC series Journeyman until the cancellation of the show in December 2007. 

In the 2010s, Diamond appeared in the TNT series Franklin & Bash, as senior HYDRA agent Dr. Daniel Whitehall / Werner Reinhardt in the Marvel Cinematic Universe (MCU) television series Marvel's Agents of S.H.I.E.L.D., and had roles in Firebreather, Moneyball, Common Law, and Wayward Pines. He played plantation owner Tom Macon on season one of WGN's series Underground.

Personal life
Diamond was married to Fredrika Kesten from 1995 to 1997. Since 2004, he has been married to actress Marnie McPhail.

Filmography

Film

Television

Video Games

References

External links
 

1967 births
Male actors from New York City
American male film actors
American male television actors
Juilliard School alumni
Living people
People from Brooklyn
University of North Carolina at Chapel Hill alumni
20th-century American male actors
21st-century American male actors
Trinity School (New York City) alumni
People from Manhattan